George Antwi Boateng (born 5 September 1975) is a former professional footballer who played as a defensive midfielder. He is Assistant Coach of the Ghana national team. Born in Ghana, raised in Holland and he represented the Netherlands internationally, making four appearances for the Netherlands national team.

Club career
Born in Nkawkaw, Ghana, after playing 70 games for Dutch giants Feyenoord Rotterdam, Boateng completed a £220,000 move to Coventry City in 1998. Under the management of Gordon Strachan he proved himself to be a solid defensive midfielder, helping the attacking Dublin-Huckerby Coventry side of 1998 finish eleventh in the Premier League and enjoy mid table stability. He is still fondly remembered by Sky Blues fans as being responsible for breaking one of Coventry's longstanding hoodoo's-victory at Villa Park: Boateng scored twice in the 4–1 win over Aston Villa at Villa Park on 27 February 1999, ending Coventry's 63-year-long wait for a league win at the ground.

The next season Boateng transferred to Aston Villa for £4.5 million. He proceeded to play 131 matches for Villa, including an FA Cup final defeat against Chelsea in 2000. The tough-tackling central midfielder then fell out with manager Graham Taylor in the 2001–02 season. After a move to Liverpool collapsed due to demands from agents, that summer Boateng completed a £5 million move to Middlesbrough.

Boateng made his full debut on the first day of the 2002–03 season away to Southampton in an uneventful game that finished 0–0. Occupying the defensive midfield position, he became the solid platform upon which Middlesbrough built their attack. He recovered from an ankle operation in the summer of 2003 to be fit for the start of the 2003–04 season. That season, he was part of the Middlesbrough team which lifted the League Cup for the first time.

In the 2004–05 season, he scored his first goal for Middlesbrough in a 4–0 win at Blackburn Rovers on 16 October 2004. However, he was injured for eight weeks with a broken toe; during this period, Middlesbrough dropped from fourth down to ninth in the league. He did recover in time to help Middlesbrough obtain the results they needed for qualification for the UEFA Cup. In a poll on the official Boro website, fans voted him the player most missed due to injury in the 2004–05 season. He started for Middlesbrough in the 2006 UEFA Cup Final.

In June 2006 he signed a new three-year contract with Middlesbrough. He was announced as the new club captain on 21 July 2006, replacing Gareth Southgate, who had been promoted to manager. On 10 March 2007, he scored in an FA Cup tie against league leaders Manchester United, his first goal in the tournament since 1999 when he scored for Coventry against Macclesfield Town.

On 22 January 2008, Boateng had his captaincy rescinded by Gareth Southgate. Southgate cited his desire for Boateng to "concentrate on his game". He was replaced as captain by Emanuel Pogatetz.

Hull City announced on 10 July 2008 that Boateng had agreed to sign a contract with them. The move was completed on 16 July, after the completion of a medical.
On 6 February 2010, Boateng scored his first career goal for Hull City in a 2–1 win over Manchester City, their first win since November 2009.

Boateng's contract with Hull City came to an end following their relegation from the Premier League in 2010. He was confirmed as having left the club along with former Dutch national teammate Jan Vennegoor of Hesselink.

After holding talks with Celtic he joined Greek side Skoda Xanthi on a two-year deal.

On 27 July 2011, it was announced that Boateng had joined Nottingham Forest, on a one-year deal.

Boateng scored his first goal for Nottingham Forest in dramatic fashion, scoring in the 94th minute to grab Forest a point against Leicester City. At the end of June 2012 he left the club.

On 15 November 2012, he arrived at Kuala Lumpur International Airport to sign a contract with T-Team. Four days later, he signed a one-year contract, linking him again with former Hull City teammate and Republic of Ireland international Caleb Folan.

International career
Although born in Ghana, Boateng chose to represent Netherlands at international level, earning four caps in total for Oranje.

Boateng made his international debut for the Netherlands in a 1–1 draw with Denmark in November 2001.

Managerial career

Kelantan FA
In 2014, Boateng was unveiled as Kelantan FA new head coach to replace Steve Darby who had been shown the exit door after a 4–0 loss to Sime Darby F.C. On 6 May 2014, Kelantan FA came back from 3–0 down to draw 3–3 with Felda United F.C. in first leg of the Malaysia FA Cup semi-final in Boateng's first game as head coach. Boateng apologised to the Kelantan fans after Kelantan FA were knocked out of the Malaysia Cup by Kedah FA with 4–3 aggregate, and there were reports saying that he would step down from his role as Kelantan FA head coach the following season but that proved to be wrong by Kelantan FA President, Annuar Musa. He was moved to the Technical Director position on 24 March 2015, and his position as head coach was taken by Mohd Azraai Khor Abdullah. Boateng left his post as technical director of Kelantan on 11 May 2015 in order to work as coach or manager again.

Blackburn Rovers
On 5 September 2018, Boateng signed as Under 13's head coach at Championship club Blackburn Rovers where he coached different age groups at the academy.

Aston Villa
On 29 July 2019, it was announced that Boateng had left Rovers to take up a position as Aston Villa Under-18 Professional Development Coach.

In September 2020, Boateng was promoted to become the Professional Development Coach of the under 23 squad at Aston Villa .

On 26 August 2022, Boateng announced that he would be leaving his role at Aston Villa in order to focus on his role with the Ghana national team in the build up to the 2022 FIFA World Cup that winter.

Ghana national team
In May 2022 the Ghana Football Association announced that Boateng would be the new assistant coach of Ghana national team.

Personal life
Boateng is a devout Christian and says his faith affects the way he conducts himself. In an interview with Church Times he stated: "My family and I have become very devoted Christians. Hearing and acting on the Word is very important."

Career statistics

Club

Coaching statistics

Honours
Aston Villa
 UEFA Intertoto Cup: 2001
 FA Cup: runner-up 1999–2000

Middlesbrough
 Football League Cup: 2003–04
 UEFA Cup: runner-up 2005–06

References

External links

Netherlands profile at OnsOranje

1975 births
Living people
People from Eastern Region (Ghana)
Ghanaian emigrants to the Netherlands
Association football midfielders
Ghanaian footballers
Dutch footballers
Netherlands international footballers
Netherlands under-21 international footballers
Excelsior Rotterdam players
Feyenoord players
Coventry City F.C. players
Aston Villa F.C. players
Middlesbrough F.C. players
Hull City A.F.C. players
Xanthi F.C. players
Nottingham Forest F.C. players
Terengganu F.C. II players
Eredivisie players
Eerste Divisie players
Premier League players
English Football League players
Super League Greece players
Dutch expatriate footballers
Expatriate footballers in England
Expatriate footballers in Greece
Expatriate footballers in Malaysia
Dutch expatriate sportspeople in England
Dutch expatriate sportspeople in Greece
Dutch expatriate sportspeople in Malaysia
Ghanaian Christians
Dutch Christians
Dutch expatriate football managers
Aston Villa F.C. non-playing staff
Blackburn Rovers F.C. non-playing staff
Kelantan FA managers
FA Cup Final players
Association football coaches